The Domino Principle is a 1977 neo-noir thriller film starring Gene Hackman, Candice Bergen, Mickey Rooney and Richard Widmark. The film is based on the novel of the same name and was adapted for the screen by its author Adam Kennedy. It was directed and produced by Stanley Kramer.

Kramer wrote in his memoirs that he "wouldn't be surprised" if Hackman, Bergen and Widmark "would prefer to remain as anonymous as the conspirators" in the film, adding "if I'm right, it's a feeling I share."

Plot
Roy Tucker (Gene Hackman), serving time for the murder of his wife's first husband, is approached in prison by a man named Tagge (Richard Widmark) on behalf of a mysterious organization with an offer: in exchange for helping him escape and start a new life, Tucker must work for the organization for a few weeks. Following his escape with cellmate Spiventa (Mickey Rooney), whom the organization immediately kills, Tucker flies to Puntarenas, Costa Rica where he is reunited with his wife Ellie (Candice Bergen). After a few idyllic days, the organization's Tagge, Pine (Edward Albert) and General Reser (Eli Wallach) return them to Los Angeles. There, the details of his mission slowly unfold. He realizes that he is expected to assassinate someone and refuses. The organization retaliates by kidnapping his wife.

The next morning, Tucker fires on his target from a helicopter, but it is hit by return fire and crashes. Tucker and Reser escape but Tucker takes Pine hostage and demand a plane and the return of his wife. At the airstrip, Tucker tells Tagge that he deliberately fired short. Tagge reveals that he had two other shooters in place, including Tucker's supposedly murdered cellmate Spiventa, and Tagge's group has been manipulating Tucker for over a decade. Aboard the plane with Ellie, Tucker spots someone planting a toolbox in the back of Tagge's car. Unable to get the pilot to abort takeoff, Tucker watches helplessly as Tagge is blown up with his car. The couple return to Costa Rica where Tucker sees his new life dismantled as quickly as it was assembled: his false passport destroyed, his money taken and Ellie killed. Spiventa and Pine arrive to kill Tucker, but he gets the drop on them and dumps their bodies in the ocean. The film closes with a resolute Tucker vowing not to give in, unaware he is in the crosshairs of yet another assassin.

Cast
 Gene Hackman as Tucker
 Candice Bergen as Ellie
 Richard Widmark as Tagge
 Mickey Rooney as Spiventa
 Edward Albert as Ross Pine
 Eli Wallach as General Reser
 Ken Swofford as Ditcher
 Neva Patterson as Gaddis
 Jay Novello as Captain Ruiz
 Joseph V. Perry as Bowkemp
 Majel Barrett as Mrs. Schnaible

Production

Development
The Domino Principle was based on the sixth novel by former actor Adam Kennedy. New American Library purchased the paperback rights for $250,000 and there was considerable interest in the film rights before publication. The novel came out in 1975. The Los Angeles Times praised the book's "power and originality". The New York Times praised Kennedy as "a fine writer who maintains suspense until the end."

In November 1975 Stanley Kramer announced he had purchased the rights for a reported $250,000. Kramer said the novel "is not only an exciting adventure but also stresses that such things could happen here."

In March 1976 Kramer announced he had signed a two picture deal with Lew Grade to make the film, the first of which was to be The Domino Principle with Gene Hackman and Candice Bergen, and the second of which was to be The Sheikhs of Araby, a comedy with Sid Caesar and Don Rickles. (That film would ultimately never be made.)

Kramer said he never identified who hired the assassin or their target because "that is not the point of the picture. The point I tried to make is that there are powerful, undetected forces that affect our destiny without even us suspecting they exist."

Filming
Filming took place in April and May 1976. On the first day of location filming in San Quentin Prison, a guard was stabbed by an inmate.

Hackman later said "we had a lot of problems on that film; I had arguments with Stanley Kramer." Hackman later read a published diary written by Kramer during the making of the film which described Hackman's behavior on set. The actor called the diary "embarrassing but I have to say it was accurate. And he was probably right in his remarks about me. The film we were making just wasn't worth the difficulties I was giving him. The truth is I was in trouble on that film and I got scared."

In December 1976 Bergen said about the film, "thanks to Gene it turned out to be the best part I've ever done. I said, 'I have such a long way to go before I can become that woman, Gene. I just can't do it unless you help me.' He was incredibly generous with his time and energy, his enthusiasm and his outrageous skill. For the first time I took a risk and didn't rely on my looks." However Bergen later called the film "terrible" and said she only did it "because it gave me the chance to play an ordinary woman. I put on a sappy wig and wore sappy clothes and for once in my life I didn't look like Candice Bergen and they [the critics] creamed me for that saying I looked like Shelley Winters."

Reception

Critical response
The film opened to mostly negative reviews and lasted only two to three weeks in theaters, dooming Kramer's first attempt at directing a thriller.

Film critic Vincent Canby of The New York Times (which wasn't full of praise for the film) focused on the fact that the film's plot made no sense, noting at one point that when Hackman's character said "I've done a lot of bad things in my life, but I ain't going to do that" the question of "What is he not going to do?" was neither established nor answered.

The Variety Staff wrote in their review: "The Domino Principle is a weak and tedious potboiler starring Gene Hackman as a tool of mysterious international intrigue, and a barely recognizable Candice Bergen in a brief role as his perplexed wife. Stanley Kramer’s film contains a lot of physical and logistical nonsense."

James Monaco wrote that The Domino Principle don't do much but play with paranoia.

Box Office
According to Lew Grade, who helped finance the film, it "broke even."

"I'm told a lot of people didn't understand it," said Hackman later. "I didn't understand it either."

Release
The Domino Principle was released on VHS on January 1, 1998, by Avid Home Entertainment. The film was released on DVD on January 24, 2006, by Lionsgate Home Entertainment.

Legacy
Stanley Kramer and Kennedy were later going to reunite on an adaptation of Raise the Titanic! for Lew Grade, which replaced Araby as Kramer's second film under his deal with Grade. However Kramer left that project.

References

External links

1977 films
Films directed by Stanley Kramer
Films produced by Stanley Kramer
Films scored by Billy Goldenberg
American political thriller films
Films based on American novels
1970s thriller drama films
ITC Entertainment films
Embassy Pictures films
American neo-noir films
1977 drama films
1970s English-language films
1970s American films